Emud Mokhberi  (born February 1978, Michigan) is an Iranian-American film director. In 2009, he was nominated for an Academy Award for Best Animated Short Film for Oktapodi. Oktapodi was also included in the Animation Show of Shows.

After a childhood spent in Tehran and Stockholm, Emud Mokhberi moved to Southern California in 1993 and shortly thereafter started his studies at the University of California, Los Angeles. After returning to UCLA for a master's degree in computer graphics, he was introduced to animation and subsequently studied film at the UCLA School of Film, Theater, and Television and Gobelins, l'école de l'image in Paris, France. In 2007, he directed Oktapodi with five other students at Gobelins: Julien Bocabeille, François-Xavier Chanioux, Olivier Delabarre, Quentin Marmier, and Thierry Marchand.

Filmography
 Oktapodi (2007) (writer, director)

References

External links
Official Website

Living people
1978 births
Animators from Michigan
Iranian animators
American animated film directors
Film directors from Michigan
American people of Iranian descent